Death Trilogy can refer to
 Films of Alejandro González Iñárritu
 Films of Gus Van Sant
 An omnibus collecting Terry Pratchett's first three Death novels: Mort, Reaper Man and Soul Music